Russell Crotty (born 1956, San Rafael) is a Southern California based artist whose work has been shown internationally and across the United States. His work incorporates astronomical, landscape, and surfing themes. Especially known for drawings on paper-coated suspended globes and within large-scale books, he continues to explore new ideas that investigate and expand the notion of “works on paper.”

Education 
 MFA, University of California, Irvine (1980)
 BFA, San Francisco Art Institute (1978)

Public collections 
Crotty's work is part of multiple public collections such as the Museum of Modern Art (New York), Pompidou (Paris), Whitney Museum of American Art (New York), Museum of Contemporary Art (Los Angeles), San Francisco Museum of Modern Art, Fine Arts Museum, San Francisco, New York Public Library, and more.  He participated in "A Grain of Dust A Drop of Water: The 5th Gwangju Biennale" in 2004.

Awards 
 2015 Guggenheim Fellowship, John Simon Guggenheim Memorial Foundation
 2008 Artists' Fellowship Programme, The Ballinglen Arts Foundation, Ballycastle, County Mayo, Ireland
 1999 Visual Arts Fellowship, Peter Reed Foundation, NY, NY
 1991 Visual Arts Fellowship, National Endowment for the Arts

Publications 
 Campbell, Clayton, "Russell Crotty at Shoshana Wayne Gallery," Artweek, April (2009), p. 16
 Sheets, Hilarie; “The Big Draw,” ARTnews, January, p. 98-103
 Sheets, Hilarie M., "The Universe at the Tip of His Ballpoint Pen", The New York Times (May 2, 2004)

References 

American artists
1956 births
Living people